The University of the Thai Chamber of Commerce (UTCC) (Thai: มหาวิทยาลัยหอการค้าไทย) is a private non-profit higher education institution in Bangkok, Thailand. The university's origin dates back to 1940, with the foundation of the College of Commerce in Bangkok. In 1984, the college was granted full university status under its present name.

The university is academically organized into eight schools: business, accountancy, economics, humanities, science, communication arts, engineering, and law. All offer degree programs, in English and Thai, to the doctoral level. The university has strong ties to entrepreneurs in Thailand through its founding body, the Thai Chamber of Commerce. It also serves in various advisory functions to several ASEAN countries. The university's business school is accredited by the US Accreditation Council for Business Schools and Programs.

The university enforces a strict student dress code.

History
The university has the longest history of private higher education in Thailand. At its founding, the College of Commerce offering a six-month program and a two-year program for 300 students. It reopened in 1963, after its closure in December 1941 following the Japanese invasion and occupation of Thailand. On 17 June 1970, the college was formally accredited under the Private College Act. The first bachelor's degree programs were offered in 1967, and in 1973 the college moved to its present location in Bangkok's Din Daeng District. On 24 October 1984, it became a full university.

Enrollment and faculty
As of January 2007, the university had 19,472 undergraduate and 1,710 graduate students enrolled in its various programs.

Since its foundation, the university has maintained a close relationship and cooperation with the Thai Chamber of Commerce. In addition to full-time faculty members with academic backgrounds, there are many part-time lecturers who are successful executives with practical knowledge and experience. As a leading university in business education in Asia, the university produces graduates with high academic and business ability and ethics.

Degree programs and campus facilities
The university provides bachelor's degrees, master's degrees,  and doctoral degree programmes. It offers a low faculty-student ratio and small class sizes.

A number of programs are linked internationally through student exchange programs with universities in the US, Australia, and Europe. All international classes are taught in English.

The university's facilities provide a modern teaching environment, with air-conditioned classrooms, a central library, language laboratories, wireless internet on campus, a broadcast TV channel, and sport facilities.

Research centres

 Research Institute for Policy Evaluation and Design: Interdisciplinary research with a focus on Southeast Asia
 The UTCC Logistics Research Center
 The Center for Economic and Business Forecasting
 ASEAN Mass Communication Studies and Research Center
 Family Business Enterprise Center
 AEC Strategy Center: Business information research and consultancy with focus on the ASEAN Economic Community
 The Innovation Driven Entrepreneurship (IDE) Center, developing Innovation Driven Entrepreneurs in Thailand and Southeast Asia. http://idecenter.utcc.ac.th/

Notable people
 Phupoom Pongpanu, actor
 Jesdaporn Pholdee, actor
 Chutima Naiyana, Miss Thailand 1987
 Sot Chitalada, boxing athlete
 Itthipat Peeradechapan, entrepreneur
 Nawat Itsaragrisil, producer

References

External links
 UTCC website

Universities and colleges in Bangkok
Private universities and colleges in Thailand
Educational institutions established in 1940
1940 establishments in Thailand
Universities in Thailand
Din Daeng district